The Pop's Props Pinocchio is a single seat, open-cockpit, mid-wing, single-engine monoplane that was inspired by the Fokker Eindecker and first flown in 1994. The aircraft was produced by Pop's Props of Cooksville, Illinois and made available as plans or in kit form. The company is no longer in business and the aircraft kit is no longer available.

The aircraft was designed for the FAR 103 Ultralight Vehicles category, including the category's  empty weight limit.

Design and development
While the Pinocchio was inspired by the First World War Fokker Eindecker, it is not a replica of that classic fighter aircraft. Reviewer Andre Cliche explains:

The Pinocchio is constructed of wood and covered in aircraft fabric. The landing gear is conventional with bungee-sprung spoked mainwheels and includes a tailskid. The mid-mounted wing has a double surface and full-span ailerons. The wing is wire-braced from a kingpost mounted just ahead of the single cockpit. The fuselage is square in cross-section and the aft part from the wing root to the tailplane is not fabric covered, but is left as bare wooden structure to save weight.

The open-cockpit environment, without a windshield, requires that the pilot wear goggles as was common in World War I.

Due to the laborious wood and fabric construction, builder completion time from plans is estimated at 750 man-hours and 500 hours from the kit. At the time the kit was available, it could be ordered as one kit or as several sub-kits.

Specifications (Pinocchio)

See also

References

1990s United States ultralight aircraft
Homebuilt aircraft
Pinocchio
Aircraft first flown in 1994
Mid-wing aircraft
Single-engined tractor aircraft